"Wolf" is a song by South Korean–Chinese boy band Exo, released on May 30, 2013, as the lead single of their first studio album XOXO. It was released in both Korean and Chinese versions by their label SM Entertainment, and was their first song recorded by all twelve members.

Background 
"Wolf" was composed by Will Simms, Nermin Harambašić from Dsign Music and S.M. Entertainment resident songwriter Kenzie. Kenzie also provided the lyrics for the Korean version of the song while Zhou Weijie penned the lyrics for the Mandarin Chinese version, "狼与美女".  Yoo Young-jin provides background vocals. The song is produced by Will Simms and Kenzie, and is described as a Dubstep inspired Hip-hop song that tells a tragic love story between a werewolf and a beauty.

The dance for the song was choreographed by Tony Testa. In several shows such as Arirang's After School Club, the members explain that the dance has 3 elements: the trees and forest, the caves, and the wolf itself. Member Kris revealed that it took them approximately 3 to 4 months to get the choreography down, due to its level of difficulty.

A demo version of the song was leaked in February 2013, in response to which producer Ryan Jhun later gave a warning to illegal downloaders on May 29, 2013, "...I will report it to FBI and service department for all links...".

Release and promotions 
On May 30, 2013, the Korean and Chinese versions of the music video for "Wolf" were released.

EXO started promoting for the song on Korean music program on May 30, 2013.

Both song versions were released digitally on June 3, 2013. The first performance of the Mandarin version of the song was aired on a popular Chinese variety show Happy Camp in mid-June.

Music videos 
On May 30, 2013, the Korean and Chinese versions of the music video for "Wolf" were released. The music videos features the performance of the song by the members.

Reception 
The song reached number ten on Gaon Digital Chart, number 25 on Korea K-Pop Hot 100, and number four on Billboard US World Digital Songs.

"Wolf" earned EXO their first win on South Korean music programs. It won first place 4 times in total.

Charts

Weekly charts

Monthly charts

Sales

Accolades

References

Songs about werewolves
Exo songs
2013 songs
2013 singles
Songs written by Kenzie (songwriter)
Korean-language songs
SM Entertainment singles
Songs written by Will Simms